Puerto Rico Highway 185 (PR-185) is a main highway that connects Canóvanas, Puerto Rico to Juncos, Puerto Rico and is about 25 kilometers long. It begins in downtown of Canóvanas, very close to Puerto Rico Highway 3 and ends in Puerto Rico Highway 952 and Puerto Rico Highway 30 in Juncos. For people coming from/going to Caguas, the highway has a direct intersection with PR-30; for those coming from/going to Humacao, drivers have to take short highway PR-952 and then take PR-189 just before its intersection with PR-30, hence this exit being one of the most disorganized junctions in the island between a main highway and a main freeway or tollway in the island. New Puerto Rico Highway 66 also has a poor-designed intersection with the highway, since it only allow people going to/coming from Carolina (west) and not the east. This is probably because the short segment open from the new tollway immediately ends at PR-3 only 2 kilometers from the exit to PR-185 and thus expected to be fixed when the segment to Río Grande opens to the public.

The highway enters a small portion of Carolina, before it enters Canóvanas. PR-185 serves as an alternate route for people who drive the way between the metro area and the southeast, and it does not climb many hills and is generally wide. It is a much better option than taking Puerto Rico Highway 181 or going to Fajardo and then go south via PR-53, since the island is wider in the north than in the south segment.

Major intersections

Related route

Puerto Rico Highway 9185 (PR-9185) is a bypass road that branches off from PR-185 in Gurabo Abajo and ends at PR-31 in Ceiba Norte.

See also

 List of highways numbered 185

References

External links

 Llega a su fin la reconstrucción de la PR-185 que conecta Juncos con Canóvanas 

185